In Greek mythology, Magnes (Ancient Greek: Μάγνης means 'the magnet') was a name attributed to several men.

Magnes, eponym and first king of Magnesia. He was the son of Zeus and Thyia or of Aeolus and Enarete.
Magnes, a son of Argos and Perimele, and father of Hymenaeus; from him also a portion of Thessaly derived its name Magnesia.
Magnes, one of the Suitors of Penelope who came from Zacynthus along with other 43 wooers. He, with the other suitors, was killed by Odysseus with the assistance of Eumaeus, Philoetius, and Telemachus.

Notes

References 

Antoninus Liberalis, The Metamorphoses of Antoninus Liberalis translated by Francis Celoria (Routledge 1992). Online version at the Topos Text Project.
Apollodorus, The Library with an English Translation by Sir James George Frazer, F.B.A., F.R.S. in 2 Volumes, Cambridge, MA, Harvard University Press; London, William Heinemann Ltd. 1921. ISBN 0-674-99135-4. Online version at the Perseus Digital Library. Greek text available from the same website. 
Hesiod, Catalogue of Women from Homeric Hymns, Epic Cycle, Homerica translated by Evelyn-White, H G. Loeb Classical Library Volume 57. London: William Heinemann, 1914. Online version at theio.com
William Smith. A Dictionary of Greek and Roman biography and mythology. London (1873).

Suitors of Penelope